Johann (Hans) Walter Schädler (born 11 March 1945) is a Liechtensteiner former alpine skier who competed in the 1964 Winter Olympics and in the 1968 Winter Olympics.

References

External links
 

1945 births
Living people
Liechtenstein male alpine skiers
Olympic alpine skiers of Liechtenstein
Alpine skiers at the 1964 Winter Olympics
Alpine skiers at the 1968 Winter Olympics